D'Arcy Beth Carden (born Darcy Beth Erokan) is an American actress and comedian. She is best known for her starring roles as Janet in the NBC sitcom The Good Place (2016–2020) and Greta Gill in the Prime series A League of Their Own (2022–present). She earned a nomination for a Primetime Emmy Award for Outstanding Supporting Actress in a Comedy Series for her role in The Good Place. She has held recurring roles as Gemma in Broad City (2014–2019) and as Natalie Greer in the HBO dark comedy series Barry (2018–present). 

Carden began her career performing improvisational comedy at the Upright Citizens Brigade Theatre. She went on to make appearances in several television series, including Inside Amy Schumer (2015), Crazy Ex-Girlfriend (2016), and Veep (2017). She also appeared in numerous films, such as Other People (2016), Let It Snow (2019), and Bombshell (2019).

Early life 
Darcy Beth Erokan was born and raised in Danville, California. Her father, Dennis William Mustafa Erokan, is a native of Istanbul, Turkey, who immigrated to California when he was a child; he acted in local community theater and founded MicroTimes and the Bay Area music magazine BAM.  She has two sisters, Miranda and Laney, and one brother, Will. She added an apostrophe to the spelling of her name when she was in junior high to emulate D'arcy Wretzky of the band The Smashing Pumpkins.

In 1998, she graduated from San Ramon Valley High School and later received a Bachelor of Fine Arts in Theater from Southern Oregon University.

Career 
After graduating from college, Carden moved to New York City. She joined Venus Rising, a musical-comedy company, and in 2001 she appeared in Seven Hearts, a musical about friends living in San Francisco. The following year, she starred in a holiday show in which the main character is upset that her family is obsessed with her selfish sister's wedding rather than keeping up their Christmas spirit. She also served as director and producer. Early on while pursuing her acting career, Carden also worked as a nanny for Bill Hader.

A friend invited Carden to an improvisational sketch comedy show at the Upright Citizens Brigade Theatre (UCB). Carden enjoyed the show so much, she signed on for classes and kept progressing with the group. She started with UCB in 2004 and later toured with the UCB Touring company. By 2010, she was using her married surname Carden professionally when she was a cast member for The Ride, an interactive show performed on New York City tour buses. In 2013, Carden co-created and co-starred in Terrible Babysitters, a Web original about two parents who want to find a babysitter.

Carden had a recurring role as Gemma in the Comedy Central comedy series Broad City (2014–2019), a series created by fellow UCB alumnae Ilana Glazer and Abbi Jacobson. Carden also appeared in guest roles in the comedy series Inside Amy Schumer (2015), Crazy Ex-Girlfriend (2016), and Veep (2017). Following small roles in the parody film iSteve (2013) and the romantic comedy The To Do List (2013), she appeared as Jessica in the acclaimed comedy-drama film Other People (2016).

In 2016, Carden began starring as Janet, a live virtual assistant, in the NBC comedy series The Good Place, which also stars Kristen Bell and Ted Danson. For her performance in the series, she received critical acclaim and earned nominations for the Critics' Choice Television Award for Best Supporting Actress in a Comedy Series and the Primetime Emmy Award for Outstanding Supporting Actress in a Comedy Series.  

Since 2018, Carden has had a recurring role as Natalie Greer in the HBO dark comedy-crime series Barry, starring Hader. Along with her fellow cast members, she was nominated for the Screen Actors Guild Award for Outstanding Performance by an Ensemble in a Comedy Series in 2018 and 2019.

In 2019, she appeared in the dark comedy film Greener Grass, the romantic comedy film Let It Snow, and the drama film Bombshell. She also appeared in the Netflix comedy series Bonding and the Adult Swim animated comedy series Robot Chicken.

In 2020, Carden had a recurring role on the Quibi mystery-comedy series Mapleworth Murders.

Personal life 
Carden met producer Jason Grant Carden on a trip to Disneyland with mutual friends. They married on July 31, 2010. In 2013, the couple moved from New York City to Los Angeles.

Carden used to be a full-time nanny for Bill Hader and Maggie Carey. She still maintains a close relationship with their three daughters.

Filmography

Film

Television

Web series

Theatre

Awards and nominations

References

External links 
 
 
 

Year of birth missing (living people)
Living people
American people of Turkish descent
American stage actresses
Southern Oregon University alumni
American television actresses
People from Danville, California
Actresses from California
Comedians from California
Upright Citizens Brigade Theater performers
21st-century American comedians
21st-century American actresses
American women comedians